Nalanda Maha Vidyalaya (English: Nalanda College) with most referring to Madhya Maha Vidyalaya:

 Nalanda Maha Vidyalaya Colombo
 Nalanda (Boys') Central College, Minuwangoda
 Nalanda (Girls') Central College, Minuwangoda
 Nalanda Maha Vidyalaya, Elpitiya

See also 
 Madhya Maha Vidyalaya